Muhammad VIII (1411–1431), known as "the left handed", was the fourteenth Nasrid ruler of the  Islamic Emirate of Granada in Al-Andalus on the Iberian Peninsula.

Life 
He, as eldest son, became Sultan after the death of his father Yusuf III. His first reign lasted from 1417 to 1419, and his second from 1427 to 1429. Immediately after coming to the throne, Muhammad renewed the treaties between Granada, Castile and the Marinids, and sent troops to help the Marinids in the Siege of Ceuta in 1418.

References 

Sultans of Granada
15th-century monarchs in Europe
1411 births
1431 deaths
15th century in Al-Andalus
15th-century Arabs